Euphorbia stellispina is a species of flowering plant in the family Euphorbiaceae endemic to southern Africa. It is locally known in Afrikaans as skaapnoors, sterretjie-noors, or Karoo noorsdoring. Euphorbia stellispina grows in rocky areas of karroid shrublands.

References

stellispina
Endemic flora of South Africa
stellispina